Scriptosaura is a genus of the lizard family Gymnophthalmidae. The genus is monotypic, i.e. it has only one species, Scriptosaura catimbau. It occurs in Brazil.

References

Gymnophthalmidae
Lizard genera
Taxa named by Miguel Trefaut Rodrigues
Taxa named by Ednilza Maranhão dos Santos